The Islamic American University is located in Southfield, Michigan. Their vision is to provide Islamic higher education in the United States of America. They offer correspondence and online courses.

References

External links

 www.islamicau.org Official web site

Educational institutions established in 2002
Seminaries and theological colleges in Michigan
Universities and colleges in Oakland County, Michigan
Islam in Michigan
2002 establishments in Michigan
Islamic universities and colleges in the United States